Giles Fendall Newton, MBE (27 May 1891 – 8 April 1974) was an English asbestos executive and businessman.

Family 
Giles Fendall Newton was born on 27 May 1891, the only son of William Latham Newton (1862–1948), of Holtby House, York, and Goldington, Bedford, and his wife, Violet, sixth daughter of Richard Harrison, of Eltofts. In 1921, he married Mary Cicely (died 1972), elder daughter of Brigadier Sir Frederick Meyrick, 2nd Baronet; they had one son, Michael Anthony Fendall Newton, and one daughter, Gillian Prunella Newton. The son, Michael, was a director of the Cape Asbestos Company Ltd. and Managing Director of Cape Building Products, and settled at Broadhurst Wood, Balcombe, Sussex.

Career 
After schooling at Madgalen College School, Newton went up to Lincoln College, Oxford, as an exhibitioner in 1910 to read history. He graduated with a Bachelor of Arts degree in 1914. He was commissioned into the Queen's Royal West Surrey Regiment in the first year of World War I and eventually served as an adjutant, which saw him appointed a Member of the Order of the British Empire in 1918. In 1917, he was transferred to the Ministry of Munitions.

Newton joined the board of the Cape Asbestos Company Ltd as a director in 1933; between 1957 and 1962, he was its chairman and subsequently became its President. He served as Deputy Chairman of the London Chamber of Commerce in 1945, and occupied the chair over the following two years. He was also Deputy Chair (1946) and then Chairman (1948) of the London Court of Arbitration. He occupied Staplefield Court in Staplefield, Sussex, and became that county's High Sheriff for 1946–47. He died at his home, 7 Courtenay Gate, Hove, Sussex, on 8 April 1974.

References 

1891 births
1974 deaths
British Army personnel of World War I
Military personnel from Bedfordshire
Queen's Royal Regiment officers
Members of the Order of the British Empire
High Sheriffs of Sussex
People from Goldington
People from Balcombe, West Sussex
People from Hove